Sacred Woods (French: Le bois sacré) is a 1939 French comedy film directed by Léon Mathot and starring Elvire Popesco, Gaby Morlay and Victor Boucher. It was based on a play by Robert de Flers and Gaston Arman de Caillavet which had previously been made into a 1915 Italian film by Carmine Gallone. The film's sets were designed by the art director Robert Gys.

Cast
 Elvire Popesco as Francine Margerie  
 Gaby Morlay as Adrienne Champmorel  
 Victor Boucher as Paul Margerie  
 André Lefaur as Monsieur Champmorel  
 Marcel Dalio as Zakouskine, le danseur  
 Armand Bernard as Monsieur des Fargottes  
 Jean Témerson as L'huissier 
 Marie-Jacqueline Chantal 
 Germaine Charley  
 Eddy Debray 
 Gustave Gallet    
 Suzanne Henri   
 Marcel Lamy  
 Léon Larive  
 France Marion 
 Georges Paulais   
 Marcel Rouzé   
 Jacques Tarride   
 Claire Vervin   
 Charles Vissières

References

Bibliography 
 Dayna Oscherwitz & MaryEllen Higgins. The A to Z of French Cinema. Scarecrow Press, 2009.

External links 
 

1939 films
French comedy films
1939 comedy films
1930s French-language films
Films directed by Léon Mathot
French films based on plays
French black-and-white films
1930s French films